Dora Mmari Msechu (born August 24, 1956) was the Ambassador of Tanzania to Sweden from 2014 until 2017.  She was also accredited to Denmark, Finland, Norway, Iceland, Estonia, Latvia, Ukraine and Lithuania.

References

Tanzanian women ambassadors
Living people
Ambassadors of Tanzania to Sweden
Ambassadors of Tanzania to Denmark
Ambassadors of Tanzania to Finland
Ambassadors of Tanzania to Norway
Ambassadors of Tanzania to Iceland
Ambassadors of Tanzania to Estonia
Ambassadors of Tanzania to Latvia
Ambassadors of Tanzania to Lithuania
Ambassadors of Tanzania to Ukraine
1956 births